Jim  is one of two major fictional characters in the classic 1884 novel Adventures of Huckleberry Finn by Mark Twain. The book chronicles his and Huckleberry's raft journey down the Mississippi River in the antebellum Southern United States. Jim, who is often referred to in the book as a "nigger," is a  black man who is fleeing slavery; "Huck", a 13-year-old white boy, joins him in spite of his own conventional understanding and the law.

Character inspiration
The character may have been a composite portrait of black men Twain knew, or based on the "shrewd, wise, polite, always good-natured ..." formerly enslaved African-American George Griffin, whom Twain employed as a butler, starting around 1879, and treated as a confidant.

Twain grew up in the presence of his parents' and other Hannibal, Missourians' slaves, and listened to their stories; an uncle, too, was a slave owner.

Fictional biography
Jim's is one of the several spoken dialects called deliberate in a prefatory note. Academic studies include Lisa Cohen Minnick's 2004 Dialect and Dichotomy: Literary Representations of African American Speech  and Raphaell Berthele's 2000 "Translating African-American Vernacular English into German: The problem of 'Jim' in Mark Twain's Huckleberry Finn".

The character is introduced at the beginning of Chapter Two, seen at midnight by the two boys, Huck and Tom, standing silhouetted in the doorway of the outdoor detached kitchen. He hears them approach and inquires into the darkness; he states that he will wait to hear the sound repeated, and he sits at the doorway until he dozes, relieving the hidden narrator's tension indicated by an entire paragraph on an itch unscratched because of fear, of which Jim is unaware. He awakens from dreams of witches (see  Richard Dorson's 1956 Negro Folktales in Michigan), and from a nickel left by the boys becomes a storyteller of regional fame, able to command pay for his tales, and in the concluding phrase, all but unfit to be a servant.

Jim flees from his owner after overhearing her discussing whether or not to sell him for 800 dollars. He meets up with Huck on Jackson's Island. The two travel on a raft together, and Jim plans to reach Cairo, Illinois, so that he can be free and buy his family's freedom as well.

His character and perceptions dominate the novel and include spirituality, parental tenderness, and nonviolence: he leaves unmolested two rogues - Jim's term is "rascals" - who have taken over the raft despite their vulnerability as they sleep drunk.

When the rogues sell Jim as an escaped slave, the character Tom Sawyer arrives. Tom knows that Jim is a free man by this point (having been freed by his owner, Miss Watson, in her will), but uses the opportunity of Jim being imprisoned to act out prison escape fantasies from books he has read, refusing Huck's simpler plans that would free Jim easily, but without the drama that Tom sought. Jim, who is now on a plantation owned by Tom's aunt and uncle, is freed by the boys. However, Tom is shot by a pursuer. Jim gives up his freedom to help nurse Tom back to health, and is taken back to the plantation in chains. Upon waking up, Tom admits that he knew Jim was free the whole time, and Jim is released. Tom pays Jim 40 dollars, and the trio departs.

Academic reception
As a study of two slaves escaping, Huckleberry Finn is largely sympathetic to the plight of escaped slaves and critical of the institution of slavery, According to Cliff Notes: "Jim’s logic, compassion, intelligence, and above all, his loyalty toward Huck, Tom, and his own family, establish him as a heroic figure."

However, beginning in the 20th century the novel was frequently criticized for depicting Jim as a stereotype, and Tom as an aggressor. According to Professor Stephen Railton of the University of Virginia, Twain was unable to fully rise above the stereotypes of black people that white readers of his era expected and enjoyed, and therefore resorted to minstrel show-style comedy to provide humor at Jim's expense and ended up conforming to rather than challenging late-19th century racist stereotypes.

Portrayals
Actors who have portrayed Jim in films and TV:
George H. Reed (1920)
Clarence Muse (1931)
Rex Ingram (1939)
Frederick Spencer (1944)
Archie Moore (1960)
Serge Nubret (1968 in Les Aventures de Tom Sawyer) 
Feliks Imokuede in (1973 in Hopelessly Lost) 
Paul Winfield (1974 and 1990)
Antonio Fargas (1975)
Blu Mankuma (1979)
Samm-Art Williams (1986)
Courtney B. Vance (1993)
Jacky Ido in (2012)
Miles Mussenden (2014)
Daniel Edward Mora (2015)
Deren Tadlock (2016 in Jean-Claude_Van_Johnson as Victor playing Jim in a fictional movie)

See also
List of films featuring slavery

References

External links
Cliffs Notes Jim

All articles with unsourced statements
Watson, Jim
Watson, Jim
Fictional slaves
Male characters in literature
Black people in literature
Literary characters introduced in 1884
Fictional characters from Missouri
Adventure film characters